Will Lawing (born November 27, 1985), is an American football coach who is the tight ends coach for the New England Patriots of the National Football League (NFL). He previously served as an assistant coach at Penn State University and Juniata College. Lawing served with Bill O'Brien in various assistant coaching roles since 2014, including roles with the Houston Texans, Alabama Crimson Tide, and New England Patriots.

Playing career
Lawing played college football for the North Carolina Tar Heels.

Coaching career

Houston Texans
Starting in 2014, Lawing spent three years as defensive quality control coach for head coach Bill O' Brien and the Houston Texans. He served as an offensive line assistant in 2017 and 2018. On February 5, 2019, Lawing was named the tight ends coach of the Houston Texans.

Alabama
After the Texans coaching change before the 2021 season, Lawing followed Bill O'Brien to Alabama to work under Nick Saban as an analyst.

References

External links
 Houston Texans profile
 Juniata profile

1985 births
Living people
People from Boone, North Carolina
Players of American football from North Carolina
North Carolina Tar Heels football players
Coaches of American football from North Carolina
Juniata Eagles football coaches
Penn State Nittany Lions football coaches
Houston Texans coaches
Alabama Crimson Tide football coaches